Dominique Foata (born October 12, 1934) is a mathematician who works in enumerative combinatorics. With Pierre Cartier and Marcel-Paul Schützenberger he pioneered the modern approach to classical combinatorics, that lead, in part, to the current blossoming of algebraic combinatorics. His pioneering work on permutation statistics, and his combinatorial approach to special functions, are especially notable.

Foata gave an invited talk at the International Congress of Mathematicians in Warsaw (1983). Among his honors are the Scientific Prize of the
Union des Assurances de Paris (September 1985). With  Adalbert Kerber and Volker Strehl he founded the mathematics journal Séminaire Lotharingien de Combinatoire. He is also one of the contributors of the pseudonymous collective M. Lothaire. In 1985, Foata received the Prix Paul Doistau–Émile Blutet.

He was born in Damascus while it was under French mandate.

Selected publications

Books
 with Pierre Cartier : Problèmes combinatoires de commutation et réarrangements, Lecture Notes in Mathematics, volume 85, Springer Verlag, 1969. (Réédition électronique avec trois nouveaux appendices, by D. Foata, B. Lass & Ch. Krattenthaler.)
 with Marcel-Paul Schützenberger : Théorie géométrique des polynômes eulériens, Lecture Notes in Mathematics, volume 138, Springer Verlag, 1970. (Réédition électronique.)
 La série génératrice exponentielle dans les problèmes d'énumération, Les Presses de l´Université de Montreal, 1974.
 with Aimé Fuchs : Processus stochastiques, Dunod, 2002.
 with Jacques Franchi et Aimé Fuchs : Calcul des probabilités, 3e édition, Dunod, 2012. (translated into German under the title Wahrscheinlichkeitsrechnung, by Volker Strehl. Birkhäuser Verlag AG, 1999.)

Articles

with Pierre Leroux: 
with Doron Zeilberger: 
with Guo-Niu Han: 
with Guo-Niu Han:

References

External links

Foata's website
the Foata festschrift at the Electronic Journal of Combinatorics, 1996
 Interview with Foata (January 17, 1978, Solana Beach, CA), Eugene Dynkin Collection of Mathematics Interviews, Cornell University Library.

1934 births
Living people
20th-century French mathematicians
21st-century French mathematicians
Combinatorialists
People from Damascus
Prix Paul Doistau–Émile Blutet laureates